Highland Park High School (HPHS) is a four-year comprehensive public high school that serves students in ninth through twelfth grades from the borough of Highland Park, in Middlesex County, New Jersey, United States, as the lone secondary school of the Highland Park Public Schools system. The school has been accredited by the Middle States Association of Colleges and Schools Commission on Elementary and Secondary Schools since 1940.

As of the 2021–22 school year, the school had an enrollment of 488 students and 44.0 classroom teachers (on an FTE basis), for a student–teacher ratio of 11.1:1. There were 123 students (25.2% of enrollment) eligible for free lunch and 19 (3.9% of students) eligible for reduced-cost lunch.

History
The original school building was designed by architect Alexander Merchant. Opened in September 1926, the school was named Franklin Junior High School, serving students through tenth grade and constructed at a cost of $360,000 (equivalent to $ million in ). After appeals from residents, grades 11 and 12 were added and the building was renamed "Highland Park High School" in 1937, before which students from Highland Park completed their secondary school education at either New Brunswick High School or Metuchen High School.

Later additions to the facility include the Science and Math wing in 1958; the English wing in 1968; the library and arts wing in the 1980s; and the cafeteria and a connected middle school (grades 6, 7, and 8) in 1996. Student population peaked in the 1960s, with a population in the 900s.

Awards, recognition and rankings
The school was the 74th-ranked public high school in New Jersey out of 339 schools statewide in New Jersey Monthly magazine's September 2014 cover story on the state's "Top Public High Schools", using a new ranking methodology. The school had been ranked 67th in the state of 328 schools in 2012, after being ranked 37th in 2010 out of 322 schools listed. The magazine ranked the school 50th in 2008 out of 316 schools. The school was ranked 31st in the magazine's September 2006 issue, which included 316 schools across the state. Schooldigger.com ranked the school tied for 184th out of 381 public high schools statewide in its 2011 rankings (an increase of 54 positions from the 2010 ranking) which were based on the combined percentage of students classified as proficient or above proficient on the two components of the High School Proficiency Assessment (HSPA), mathematics (79.0%) and language arts literacy (93.3%).

In 2018, Highland Park High School received the Gold Ranking by U.S. News & World Report, ranked 17th-best high school in New Jersey and 397th in the nation.

Also in 2018, the school won the ShopRite Cup for the best Group I sports program in New Jersey.

In 2008, two students were National Merit Finalists, twelve were National Merit Commended Scholars, and eleven were Bloustein Distinguished Scholars.

In 2007, six students were National Merit Finalists, eleven students were National Merit Commended Scholars, eleven students were Bloustein Distinguished Scholars.  Almost ten percent of the graduating class went on to Ivy League schools.

In 2006, HPHS students were recognized for Advanced Placement Awards. One student qualified for the National AP Scholar Award. 16 students qualified for the AP Scholar with Distinction Award. 13 students qualified for the AP Scholar with Honor Award. 15 students qualified for the AP Scholar Award.

In 2005, a team of three HPHS students were recognized as First Place National Finalists in the 13th Annual Toshiba/NSTA ExploraVision Awards science competition for their innovative design of a satellite-based earthquake and tsunami detection/prediction system.

Extracurricular activities
Extracurricular programs at HPHS include multiple instrumental music programs, drama club and tech crew, SAGA (the Sexuality and Gender Alliance), The Highland Fling (school newspaper), a Model United Nations and Model Congress Program, which participates at the Rutgers University Model UN and Congress conferences, as well as Philadelphia Model Congress, Dead Center (literary magazine), and the Albadome (yearbook). The school also has a DECA chapter, which competes in New Jersey's Blue Division. The HPHS academic teams compete in many all-state competitions such as Science League, Math League, and the News 12-sponsored NJ Challenge. These teams excel, having won top-10 plaques in past years.

The Community Teen Center also contributes to the school's extracurricular list, recently initiating many successful and interesting clubs and groups. Sports clubs such as volleyball and ping-pong, as well as the academic clubs, such as the Philosophy Club and Japanese Anime and Culture Club. The Philosophy Club is in close contact with Rutgers, the State University of New Jersey, which offers one of the highest ranked philosophy majors in the country. The Philosophy Club is visited by guest speakers and aims at providing a thought provoking, challenging, and analytical environment for students at Highland Park High School to advance their perspectives on a myriad of philosophical topics and controversies essential to their day-to-day lives. The Japanese Anime and Culture Club exposes its members to elements of Japanese popular culture through watching anime and reading manga in addition to Japanese language lessons from an instructor.

WVHP-FM
Beginning in 1971, the high school had a ten-watt FM radio station, WVHP, the voice of Highland Park, that broadcast from 6AM to 8AM and 5PM to 10:30PM Monday through Friday. Several radio personalities got their start there, among them Ken Friedman (WFMU-FM General Manager), Soterios Johnson was the local host for NPR's Morning Edition on WNYC -New York and Bob Sommer (KALW-FM in San Francisco & BMIR-FM - Burning Man Information Radio).  Jim Axelrod (CBS News) was also on the air at WVHP at one point.  Willie Paszamant (actor Willie Garson of Sex and The City) had a morning show at WVHP.

Athletics
Highland Park High School Owls compete in the Greater Middlesex Conference, which is comprised of public and private high schools in the Middlesex County area and operates under the supervision of the New Jersey State Interscholastic Athletic Association (NJSIAA). With 348 students in grades 10-12, the school was classified by the NJSIAA for the 2019–20 school year as Group I for most athletic competition purposes, which included schools with an enrollment of 75 to 476 students in that grade range. The football team competes in Division 1B of the Big Central Football Conference, which includes 60 public and private high schools in Hunterdon, Middlesex, Somerset, Union and Warren counties, which are broken down into 10 divisions by size and location. The school was classified by the NJSIAA as Group I South for football for 2018–2020. The school's mascot is the Owl. The colors of HPHS and their various sports teams are maroon and white.

HPHS is known for its long-time success in track and field and baseball, with more recent successes in boys' and girls' soccer and boys' and girls' tennis. There is also the girls' and boys' basketball teams and the cheer leading and dance teams that performs at football and basketball games. The school also has cross country, girls volleyball, wrestling and softball teams. HPHS is also home to an Ultimate team, the Enforcers, although the team is not affiliated with the school's varsity sports program.

The boys basketball team won the Group I state championship in 1948, defeating Weehawken High School by a score of 57-53 in the tournament's championship game.

The boys track team won the spring track title in Group II in 1958, 1959 and 1960.

The baseball team won the Central Jersey Group II state sectional championship in 1959, 1962, 1966, 1969 and 1970.

The boys indoor track team won the Group II championship in 1962, 1963, 1971 (co-champion with Lincoln High School), 1980 (co-champion with Roselle Park High School) and 1984; the girls team won the Group II title in 1981 and 2018.

The boys track team won the Group I/II state indoor relay championship in 1966 (co-champion with Clearview Regional High School), and won the Group I title in 1980, 1981 and 1984.

The HPHS football team has been under the leadership of only seven coaches during the program's entire history. Starting with Bus Lepine, then Jay Dakelman, the football team was led by its former all-state quarterback Joe Policastro (class of 1959), then Richard McGlynn, then Derek Nobles and the team is now led by Shawn Harrison. L.J. Smith, of the Baltimore Ravens, was a star of both the HPHS football and basketball teams in the 1990s. The football team won the NJSIAA Central Jersey Group I state sectional championship in 1974 (awarded by NJSIAA), 1977, 1978, 1986, 1989 and 1990. The 1977 Highland Park football team won the Central Jersey Group I state title with a 35-12 win against Dunellen High School in the championship game.

The field hockey team won the Central Jersey Group I state sectional title in 1977.

The girls track team won the winter track Group I state title in 1978, 1980 and 2017.

The girls' basketball team won the 2007 Central, Group I championship, topping Dunellen High School, 50–35 in the final.

The girls' tennis team went undefeated in the 2010 spring season.

In 2011, the boys' tennis team won the New Jersey Group I championship for the first time, defeating Leonia High School in the final round of the tournament. The 2019 team won the Group I state title at Mercer County Park, defeating Middle Township High School 4-1 in the semifinals and moving on to beat New Providence High School 3-2 in the finals.

Administration
The school's principal is Michael Lassiter. His core administration team includes the assistant principal.

William H. Donahue, who became principal of the school in 1980 and had worked at the school for three decades, was murdered in 1987.

Notable alumni

 Jim Axelrod (class of 1981), White House correspondent for CBS News.
 David Clewell (1955-2020), poet and creative writing instructor at Webster University who served as the Poet Laureate of Missouri.
 Wheeler Winston Dixon (born 1950, class of 1968), filmmaker, critic and author.
 Samuel G. Freedman (born 1955, class of 1973), journalist and author.
 Willie Garson (born 1964, as Willie Paszamant; class of 1982), actor best known for his appearances on Sex and The City
 Alan Guth (born 1947), physicist who left high school after his junior year to enroll at the Massachusetts Institute of Technology.
 Amy Herzog (class of 1996), playwright and finalist of the Pulitzer Prize for Drama, who was valedictorian of her graduating class.
 John Hulme (born 1987), author of the book series The Seems and director of the documentary Blood, Sweat & Tears: A Basketball Exorcism.
 Soterios Johnson, (class of 1986) former local host of NPR's Morning Edition on WNYC.
 Ted Kubiak (born 1942, class of 1960), infielder who played for the Kansas City / Oakland A's, Milwaukee Brewers, St. Louis Cardinals, Texas Rangers and the San Diego Padres
 Stav Prodromou (born 1944, class of 1960), businessman who was the founder and former chief executive officer of Poqet Computer Corporation.
 L. J. Smith (born 1980), tight end who has played for the Baltimore Ravens.

References

External links 

Highland Park Public Schools

Data for the Highland Park Public Schools, National Center for Education Statistics

Web page for Highland Park alumni. Includes classes 1938-Present

1926 establishments in New Jersey
Educational institutions established in 1926
Middle States Commission on Secondary Schools
Public high schools in Middlesex County, New Jersey
Highland Park, New Jersey